Brian Rosenworcel is an American drummer and co-founder of the band Guster.

Early life and education 
Rosenworcel is a native of West Hartford, Connecticut. He co-founded Guster while studying at Tufts University in the early-1990s. Rosenworcel earned a Bachelor of Arts degree from Tufts in 1995.

Career 
For many years, Rosenworcel exclusively played hand drums in the band, before expanding his setup to include a more traditional drum kit. Rosenworcel has co-written several of the group's songs and, beginning with 2003's Keep it Together, contributed to their lyrics.

Rosenworcel has maintained the band's active studio and tour journals since 1999.

Personal life 
Rosenworcel resides in Brooklyn, New York. His sister is FCC commissioner Jessica Rosenworcel. He is Jewish.

References

Musicians from Brooklyn
Tufts University alumni
American rock drummers
Jewish rock musicians
Guster members
Year of birth missing (living people)
Living people